Kunanlan a/l Subramaniam (born 15 September 1986) is a Malaysian professional footballer who plays as a winger or right-back for Malaysia Super League club Johor Darul Ta'zim.

He is one of the winning squad of the Malaysia national under-23 football team in the 2009 SEA Games Football Gold medal. He had played for the Malaysian national football team, and in summer 2009 he played twice against Manchester United in their pre-season tour of the Far East. Kunanlan is known for his fast and speedy style of football. He loves to take on defenders with his pace.

Club career

Selangor
He started with Selangor President Cup Team.  He joins Selangor FA for the 2013 Malaysia Super League after 6 years season with Negeri Sembilan FA. He made his debut on 8 January 2013 and scored his first Selangor FA goal, against his former club Negeri Sembilan FA 1–0. After that, Kunanlan added his second goal against Terengganu FA 2–1 to help Selangor FA to get three points in third game week. On 9 March 2013, he scored against Johor Darul Takzim FC in 4 minutes first half to win 4–1 in victory and have a third goal in 2013 Malaysia Super League season.

Johor Darul Ta'zim
He joins The Southern Tigers for 2015 season.

International career
In November 2010, Kunanlan was called up to the Malaysia national squad by coach K. Rajagopal for the 2010 AFF Suzuki Cup. Malaysia won the 2010 AFF Suzuki Cup title for the first time in their history.

In July 2011, he played for Malaysia XI in the matches against Arsenal FC and Liverpool FC who were on their pre-season tours, which a Malaysia XI lost 0–4 against Arsenal and later lost 3–6 to Liverpool. They also lost to Chelsea FC 0–1.

On 14 July 2016, Kunanlan announced his retirement from international football after 73 international caps.

International goals

Under-23

Career statistics

Club

Honours

Club

Johor Darul Ta'zim
 Malaysian Charity Shield (6) : 2015, 2018, 2019, 2020, 2021, 2022
 Malaysia Super League (9) : 2015, 2016, 2017, 2018, 2019, 2020, 2021, 2022
 AFC Cup (1) : 2015
 Malaysia FA Cup (1) : 2016
 Malaysia Cup (2) : 2017, 2019

Negeri Sembilan
 Malaysia Cup (2) : 2009, 2011
 Malaysia FA Cup (1) : 2010
 Malaysia Charity Shield (1) : 2012

International
 2009 SEA Games : Gold
 2010 AFF Suzuki Cup : Winner
 2014 AFF Suzuki Cup : Runner Up

References

External links
 

Living people
1986 births
People from Selangor
Malaysian footballers
Malaysia international footballers
Tamil sportspeople
Malaysian Hindus
Malaysian people of Tamil descent
Malaysian sportspeople of Indian descent
Negeri Sembilan FA players
Selangor FA players
Johor Darul Ta'zim F.C. players
Malaysia Super League players
Association football midfielders
Footballers at the 2010 Asian Games
Southeast Asian Games gold medalists for Malaysia
Southeast Asian Games medalists in football
Competitors at the 2009 Southeast Asian Games
Asian Games competitors for Malaysia
AFC Cup winning players